Briscan is an 18th-century, French Ace-Ten card game for two players played with a 32-card Piquet pack. It is a member of the Marriage group of games in which the 'marriage' of a King and Queen brings a bonus score, but Briscan takes this simple concept to extraordinary lengths.

History 
Briscan is a highly elaborate expansion of Mariage, the ancestor of the Marriage family of card games. It is also a member of the Brusquembille family, a game which it began to oust in France in the late 18th century. Its name is probably a diminutive of 'Briscambille', an old name for Brusquembille.

The rules of Briscan are first recorded in 1752 in La Plus Nouvelle Académie universelle des jeux and indicate that Briscan evolved from a similar game called Brisque which, in turn, may have developed from Brisquembille, whose rules were published in 1718 in the l'Académie universelle des jeux.

Parlett describes it as a "Gothic extravaganza" and a game of "almost hysterical excitement and complication" that squeezed a "truly phenomenal range of scores and melds" from just a 32-card pack and two five-card hands. By contrast its close cousin, Brisque, is less complicated and more playable; as is Briscan's successor and "more sober relative", Bezique, which reduced the number of melds and bonuses available.

Rules 
The following rules are based on the French Academy of Games. Where Brisque is different, this is shown in parentheses.

Briscan is a two-player game, based on Brisque, but which differs in the number of cards dealt, the way the trump turnup is handled, announcements and scoring. Game is 600 points.

Cards and dealing 
Briscan uses a 32-card Piquet pack. Players draw for the right to deal; the player drawing the highest becoming the dealer, who then deals five cards each (Brisque: six) and turns the next for trumps. The remaining cards form the talon which is placed, face down, at right angles to, and half-covering, the upcard.

Exchanging 
The trump Seven may only be exchanged for the upcard "before playing for the last two cards of the talon" (Brisque: it may be exchanged at any point during the game). In other words, when there are two talon cards left and each player has five hand cards, an exchange may only be done at the end of the trick. If the turnup is an Ace, Ten or court card, the dealer scores ten points.

Melds and bonuses 
Inspired by Piquet, Briscan has a very large number of possible melds and bonuses. Melds may only be made when at least one trick has been taken and when on lead.

Melds 
There are the following melds in Briscan (Brisque: only marriages and 2 of the quartets count)
 Marriages: a player who holds a King and Queen of the same suit scores 20 or, if a trump marriage, 40 points.
 Sequences: runs of three or more consecutive cards of the same suit e.g. Ten, Jack, Queen. A run of three is a tierce; of four is a quatrième; and of five, a quinte. The rank of a sequence is taken from its top card, so 8-9-10 is a tierce au dix. Points are scored as per the table below, except that they are doubled in the case of trump sequences. Cards declared in a sequence may not be used for other melds.
 Quartets: four of a kind score as shown in the table. (Brisque: four Kings or four Queens immediately win the game)
 Cartes blanches: hands comprising all court cards and no pips or, conversely, all pip cards and no courts. They attract 20 and 10 points respectively.

Bonuses 
The following bonuses count in Briscan (Brisque: only the last trick bonus is scored)
 Ace of trumps: if the Ace of trumps is held and has not been exchanged it scores 30 points
 Last five cards: if a player's last hand of five cards after the talon has been exhausted are all trumps, that player scores a bonus of 30 points.
 Winning last trick: 10 points
 Winning last five tricks: 20 additional points
 Taking most cards: 10 points
 Vole (taking all tricks): wins the game immediately

Summary 

* Scores are doubled in the case of trump sequences or quartets.

References

Literature 
 Parlett, David (1990). A History of Card Games, OUP, Oxford. 
 Parlett, David (2008). The Penguin Book of Card Games, Penguin, London. 

18th-century card games 
French card games 
French deck card games
King-Queen games